Walking Distance is an album by the Texas-based folk singer-songwriter Robert Earl Keen. It was released in the United States in 1998 on Arista Records.

The album peaked at No. 149 on the Billboard 200.

Critical reception
The Washington Post opined that "he's still a shaky singer but few folks are writing narrative songs as good as these." Entertainment Weekly called Keen "a gifted wordsmith, an indifferent melodist, and a flat-out non-singer."

Track listing
All tracks written by Robert Earl Keen, except where noted

"Down That Dusty Trail" – 3:39
"Travelin' Light" – 3:53 (Peter Case, Bob Neuwirth)
"Feelin' Good Again" – 3:17
"That Buckin' Song" – 2:19
"I'll Be Here For You" – 4:05
"Billy Gray" – 4:34 (Norman Blake)
"Theme: Road To No Return" / "Carolina" – 8:14
"New Life In Old Mexico" – 4:18
"Still Without You" / "Conclusion: Road To No Return" – 5:13
Silent Track – 1:00
"Happy Holidays Y'all" – 3:21

References

External links 
 "Holiday Coping" by Neal Conan from NPR's Talk of the Nation December 18, 2002 (includes Keen's in-studio performance)

1998 albums
Robert Earl Keen albums
Arista Records albums